No. 178 Squadron RAF was a Royal Air Force Squadron that was a bomber unit based in Egypt, Libya and Italy in World War II.

History

Formation in World War II
The Squadron was equipped with Liberators at Shandur, Egypt on 15 January 1943 and then moved to Libya, then Italy from March 1944. The squadron was actively involved in the air drop operations in support of the besieged Polish Home Army in Warsaw in 1944.

Postwar
In November 1945 the Liberators were replaced by Lancasters at Fayid,  Egypt. It was disbanded upon renumbering as No. 70 Squadron RAF on 15 April 1946.

Aircraft operated

References

External links
 History of No.'s 176–180 Squadrons at RAF Web
 178 Squadron history on the official RAF website

178
Military units and formations established in 1943